The Daniel Webster Debate Society at Phillips Exeter Academy is the oldest secondary school student debate union and literary club in the United States. Established in 1818 as The Golden Branch Literary Society, a secret society, the club later changed its name to honor Senator Daniel Webster, who attended the Academy. The club's primary focus today is on parliamentary-style debate, with some focus on policy debate and speechmaking.

Name 
The previous name of the society was taken from The Golden Bough of the Aeneid of Virgil's Aeneid. When the society merged with the Gideon L. Soule Literary Society, its name was changed to the Branch-Soule Debating Society. In October, 2000, several speaking clubs, including the Debate Team, Branch-Soule Society, Mock Trial Team, and Junior Statesmen of America, merged to form the Golden Branch Society, due to low attendance. The society later changed its name to the Daniel Webster Debate Society in honor of Daniel Webster.

History 
The society was founded on July 16, 1818. It was preceded by the Rhetorical Society of the Phillips Exeter Academy, founded in 1807, which counted among its members many future founders of the Golden Branch. It was dissolved in 1820. Professor Hosea Hildreth, the second professor of mathematics and natural philosophy, performed the initiating ceremonies for the Golden Branch, which then elected Charles Soule, the founder, as its first president. On August 19, 1841, the constitution of the society was amended by the trustees of Exeter in order to prevent the students from meeting in secret. In one instance where several students attempted to form a rival society, the club was disbanded and the students were promptly expelled by Principal Gideon Lane Soule. On June 12, 1878, an address on education was presented to the Golden Branch by Ralph Waldo Emerson. Another rival society, named the Gideon L. Soule Literary Society, was founded on November 19, 1881. The two societies merged in 1959, forming the Branch-Soule Society, and later merged in 2000 with more clubs, forming again the Golden Branch Society. The society, now named for Daniel Webster, currently concentrates in parliamentary and other impromptu debate formats in the Debate Association of New England Independent Schools and National Speech and Debate Association .

Leadership 

Honorary members of the society include Lewis Cass, Daniel Webster, Charles Sumner, John G. Palfrey, Theodore Parker, Jared Sparks, James T. Fields, Ralph Waldo Emerson, John Greenleaf Whittier, Dan Brown, and Phillips Brooks.

In popular culture 
The society was mentioned during the July 14, 2015 episode of Jeopardy! in the final Jeopardy question: The debate team at Phillips Exeter Academy in New Hampshire is named for this man who entered the Academy in 1796.

See also 
 The Philomathean Society (Phillips Academy)

References

Phillips Exeter Academy
Student debating societies
Organizations established in 1818
Youth organizations based in New Hampshire